Hungerhill School is a coeducational secondary school located on Hungerhill Lane, off of 'Thorne Road' (the A18) in Edenthorpe, Doncaster, South Yorkshire, England.

Admissions
Hungerhill School features a curriculum for pupils aged 11 to 16. 
Students can choose the following subjects to study for GCSE:
 Art, Craft and Design
 Business Studies
 Computer Science
 Dance
 Drama
 French
 Food Technology
 Geography
 Health & Social Care
 History
 Media
 Music
 Performing Arts (includes Drama and Music combined)
 GCSE Physical Education
 Product Design
 Psychology
 Religious Education
 Spanish
 Textiles
 Triple Science
Compulsory subjects include:
 Core Physical Education
 Ethics and Philosophy
 English Language
 English Literature
 Mathematics
 PSHE
 Science

History

 The school opened in 1976 as a mixed comprehensive school with 800 pupils.
 In September 2005, it gained specialist status in Science, Mathematics and Computing.
 In 2007, the School used RFID tags embedded in students jumpers unwillingly, which meant that they could track the students.
 The school became an academy in August 2012.
 The school officially opened its new "Maths" block to students in 2014.
 As of September 2014, there are approximately 1,200 pupils attending, with over 75 teaching staff.
 On 3 July 2015, the school officially launched its Teaching School programme following the outstanding performance in GCSE examinations. Hungerhill School was one of 52 schools across England to be granted this status in that round.
 In Summer 2016, a new teaching block was completed on the school site. The building includes an examination hall, multi-use classrooms and laboratories. It is the first teaching block in the school to support the use of renewable energy, with solar panels installed on the roof.

International Schools Project
Hungerhill School is part of the International Schools Project since 2012. It aims to create links with schools in other countries and establish the differences of teaching and learning. The following schools are linked with Hungerhill:
 Apeguso Senior High School, Akosombo, Ghana
 Adjena Senior High School, Akosombo, Ghana
 Chinmaya Vidyalaya, Chennai, India
 Collège Jean Monnet, Epernay, France
Students are chosen as ambassadors for the school and are involved in a variety of different activities which develop the link between the schools.

Academic performance
In January 2015, the school decided not to establish a sixth form.
The school's GCSE results are above the national average. In 2016, 76% of pupils gained 5 or more A*-C grades, including English and Mathematics.

Alumni
Kelly Harrison, actress
Carl Lygo, Vice-Chancellor of BPP University
Joe Pugh, Doncaster Rovers forward
Tom Pugh, Scunthorpe United midfielder

References

External links
 Official website
 Edenthorpe Parish Council
 EduBase

News items
 2008 Prom
 Microchips in school uniforms in November 2007

Secondary schools in Doncaster
Academies in Doncaster